Kim Seong-jip (13 January 1919 – 20 February 2016) was a weightlifter from South Korea. He competed for South Korea in the 1948 Summer Olympics held in London in the flyweight event where he finished in third place. Also, he competed for South Korea in the 1952 Summer Olympics, 1956 Summer Olympics where he finished in third and fifth respectively. Kim was the first person to have won the same medal at two successive Summer Olympics for South Korea.

References

External links

1919 births
2016 deaths
South Korean male weightlifters
Olympic weightlifters of South Korea
Olympic bronze medalists for South Korea
Weightlifters at the 1948 Summer Olympics
Weightlifters at the 1952 Summer Olympics
Weightlifters at the 1956 Summer Olympics
Olympic medalists in weightlifting
Asian Games medalists in weightlifting
Weightlifters at the 1954 Asian Games
Weightlifters at the 1958 Asian Games
Sportspeople from Seoul
Medalists at the 1948 Summer Olympics
Medalists at the 1952 Summer Olympics
Asian Games gold medalists for South Korea
Medalists at the 1954 Asian Games
World Weightlifting Championships medalists
20th-century South Korean people
21st-century South Korean people